Erkki Penttilä (14 June 1932 – 19 April 2005) was a Finnish wrestler and Olympic medalist. He competed at the 1956 Summer Olympics in Melbourne where he received a bronze medal in freestyle wrestling.

References

External links
 

1932 births
2005 deaths
Olympic wrestlers of Finland
Wrestlers at the 1956 Summer Olympics
Wrestlers at the 1960 Summer Olympics
Finnish male sport wrestlers
Olympic bronze medalists for Finland
Olympic medalists in wrestling
Medalists at the 1956 Summer Olympics
20th-century Finnish people
21st-century Finnish people